Bal Harbour is a village in Miami-Dade County, Florida. The population was 3,093 at the 2020 US Census.

History

Since the 1920s, the Detroit-based Miami Beach Heights Corporation—headed by industrialists Robert C. Graham, Walter O. Briggs, and Carl G. Fisher—owned  of undeveloped, partially swampy land that stretched from the bay to the Atlantic. Mr. Graham assumed the duties as the developer for Bal Harbour. In the 1930s, city planners Harland Bartholomew & Associates were called in to design the Village. The company made several plans, and they were submitted to the Miami Beach Heights for review.

The original name chosen for Bal Harbour was Bay Harbour. However, the planning committee didn't think that was appropriate for a city that was on the beach. A name was invented to encompass a village that ran from the bay to the Atlantic Ocean. The b was taken from the word bay and the a and l were taken from the name Atlantic. Hence the word Bal was created.

In 1940, World War II began, and the plans were put on hold. As a goodwill gesture to the government, Robert C. Graham rented the land to the United States Air Corps for $1 per year. The Air Corps used this land to train their soldiers and established a Prisoner of War camp. The ocean front area was used as a rifle range and the barracks were set up on the west side of Collins Avenue. The camp for prisoners was located where the Bal Harbour Shops are presently.

In 1945, the war was over in both Germany and Japan. The Air Corps left the barracks buildings as a thank you to the owners of the property. These barracks were converted into apartment homes by Mr. Graham in 1946.

In order to incorporate a city in 1946, there had to be at least 25 male registered voters residing in the area. Mr. Graham had twenty five families move into the apartment homes that he had converted in order to qualify the Village for incorporation. He then hired Willard Webb, a Miami Beach tax assessor, to draft a charter for the Village. After the charter was completed, the Village of Bal Harbour was incorporated on August 14, 1946, by Mr. Graham and 25 male registered voters. The Village was operated under the city manager form of government.

The council established a volunteer fire department.

Swampland was filled, sea walls were constructed and the yacht basin was created. Contracts were signed for the sewer systems, water pumping stations and utilities. Bal Harbour was the first planned community in Florida to have its utilities placed underground. Developers set guidelines for the development of the beachfront and the residential areas. Collins Avenue was paved into four lanes with a landscaped median and later widened to the present day six lanes.

The first hotel was built and was named "The Kenilworth By-the-Sea". It was built by Tom Raffington and made famous by Arthur Godfrey. It has since been demolished and is now the Kenilworth Condominium. The first home was built at 160 Bal Cross Drive. It was built by Mr. Robert C. Graham Jr., who was the son of Bal Harbour Developer Robert C. Graham. Construction for the Sea View Hotel was started.

Bal Harbour Village was re-incorporated by a special act of the 1947 Florida Legislature and its own charter was issued June 16. This new charter supplemented the original incorporation under the General Laws of Florida. In accordance with the new charter, an election to select five to serve on the council was held June 30. The Council elected were: Edward L. Bonneau, Robert C. Graham, Jr., Glenn E. Massnick, George Whittaker, and Judge Julien Southerland. Judge Southerland was chosen as mayor. Willard Webb, who had been acting manager since the first organization, was appointed as Village Manager. Mary Wetterer was named Village Clerk and Herold Dickey was appointed Chief of Police.

In 1947, the Church by the Sea was built.
In 1948, the Beach Club was built. Its restaurant was operated by Howard Johnson's.
In 1949, a new bridge was started over Baker Haulover.

In 1956, the current Village Hall was built.
In 1956, the Hotel Americana was built. It became the Sheraton Hotel in 1980. It was imploded on November 18, 2007, to build a set of condos and a luxury aparthotel as the St. Regis.

In 1959, Bal Harbour's beach was renovated due to severe erosion.

In 1965, the Bal Harbour Shops was built by the Whitman family. Stanley Whitman was one of the incorporators who lived with his family in the barrack apartments.
In 1971, Bal Harbour's beach started a major renourishment project.
In 1984, the residents of an exclusive neighborhood in Bal Harbour were successfully sued to remove the clause preventing Jews and blacks from owning property there.

In 2008, The new Regent Bal Harbour opened, becoming the northern gateway to the Village.
In 2012, The last oceanfront undeveloped Beach Club site was sold for $220 million in order to make way to the ultra luxury Oceana at Bal Harbour.
In 2014, The Ritz-Carlton Bal Harbour, Miami opened at the former Regent Bal Harbour and ONE Bal Harbour Resort & Spa .

In 2015, it was reported in the press that "the Bal Harbour Police and the Glades County Sheriff set up a giant money laundering scheme, but it all fell apart when federal investigators and the Miami Herald found strange things going on."

From 2015 onward, Bal Harbour has become known globally as a luxury enclave. In the words of Town & Country, Bal Harbour is the "ne plus ultra" of South Florida luxury. The Village, specifically its Resort Tax Committee, has invested in developing Bal Harbour's reputation as a luxury destination. The committee collects a specific tax which "must be used for among other tourism related activities, for the enhancement of tourism, publicity and advertising purposes."
As the result of a concerted 5+ year international destination marketing effort from 2014-2019 by the Village, per capita resort tax revenues for the Village of Bal Harbour grew +35%.

Geography

Bal Harbour, Florida is located on the northern tip of the barrier island commonly referred to as Miami Beach; it is the northernmost barrier island in a chain that extends southward up to and including Key West, Florida.

The main traffic corridor running south to north through Bal Harbour is Collins Avenue, also demarked as Florida State Highway A1A.

A channel between the north end of Biscayne Bay and the Atlantic Ocean runs across the northern end of Bal Harbour.

A bridge, maintained by the State of Florida connects Bal Harbour to Haulover Park, to the north. Haulover Park is maintained by the Miami Dade Parks Commission.

Surrounding areas
  Unincorporated Miami-Dade County (Haulover Park)
  Biscayne Bay    Atlantic Ocean
 Bay Harbor Islands   Atlantic Ocean
 Bay Harbor Islands    Atlantic Ocean
  Surfside

Demographics

2020 census

As of the 2020 United States census, there were 3,093 people, 1,424 households, and 648 families residing in the village.

2010 census

As of 2010, there were 2,780 households, out of which 52.6% were vacant. In 2000, 9.2% had children under the age of 18 living with them, 36.1% were married couples living together, 4.8% had a female householder with no husband present, and 57.4% were non-families. 50.7% of all households were made up of individuals, and 24.9% had someone living alone who was 65 years of age or older.  The average household size was 1.73 and the average family size was 2.49.

2000 census
In 2000, the village population was spread out, with 10.2% under the age of 18, 3.7% from 18 to 24, 24.0% from 25 to 44, 24.7% from 45 to 64, and 37.5% who were 65 years of age or older.  The median age was 55 years. For every 100 females, there were 75.8 males.  For every 100 females age 18 and over, there were 73.6 males.

In 2000, the median income for a household in the village was $47,148, and the median income for a family was $83,570. Males had a median income of $51,227 versus $44,500 for females. The per capita income for the village was $67,680.  About 5.6% of families and 9.2% of the population were below the poverty line, including 10.5% of those under age 18 and 6.7% of those age 65 or over. This data only reflects reported income, not overall wealth.

As of 2000, speakers of English as a first language accounted for 58.29% of residents, while Spanish was at 35.14%, Polish at 2.63%, French 2.13%, Portuguese 0.99%, and Russian made up 0.82% of the population.

Education
Miami-Dade County Public Schools is the local school district.

Ruth K. Broad/Bay Harbor K–8 Center in Bay Harbor Islands serves as the local elementary and K–8 school. Residents who want to have a conventional middle school may instead choose the zoned middle school, Miami Beach Nautilus Middle School. Miami Beach Senior High School is the senior high school serving Surfside.

Notable people

 Micky Arison, owner of Miami Heat and CEO of Carnival Cruise
 Martin Bayerle, treasure hunter, finder of the RMS Republic and star of History Channel's Billion Dollar Wreck
 Edith Bouvier Beale, socialite, fashion model and cabaret performer; first cousin of Jacqueline Onassis and Lee Bouvier Radziwill, she lived her final years in Bal Harbour

References

External links
 Village of Bal Harbour official website
 Bal Harbour Miami official tourism website
 Bal Harbour Shops upscale mall

Villages in Miami-Dade County, Florida
Beaches of Miami-Dade County, Florida
Villages in Florida
Populated coastal places in Florida on the Atlantic Ocean
Beaches of Florida